Music Rescues Me is the ninth studio album by German DJ Paul van Dyk. It was released on 7 December 2018 through his label Vandit. The album features guest appearances from many artists, including Ronald van Gelderen, Alex M.O.R.P.H., Jordan Suckley, Pierre Pienaar, and Tristan D.

Track listing

Digital download
Tracklist adapted from the iTunes Store.

References

2017 albums
Paul van Dyk albums
Vandit albums